Joe Coomer may refer to:

Joe Coomer (American football) (1917–1979), American football player
Joe Coomer (author), American writer